This is a list of Dickinson College alumni. This list covers alumni from the first graduating class in July 1787 to the present.

"DNG" indicates that the alumni did not graduate.
A "—" indicates that the information is unknown.

Business

Arts and journalism

Academics and education

Government and public service

Religion

Sports

References

External links
Dickinson College Alumni

Lists of people by university or college in Pennsylvania